is a Japanese animation studio. It has produced numerous noted anime series, including the award-winning Mushishi and epic Legend of the Galactic Heroes. It is also well known for producing the anime adaptation of Katekyō Hitman Reborn!.

History
On March 17, 2006, Marvelous Entertainment announced that Artland would become a subsidiary of Marvelous Entertainment Inc., effective on April 3, 2006. Subsequently, Artland became a kabushiki-gaisha.

On November 15, 2010, Marvelous Entertainment Inc. announced the split of Artland Inc.'s animation department into Animation Studio Artland Inc., effective on 2010-12-01. All shares of the new company then were transferred to Kuniharu Okano.

In December 2010,  was established and Artland Inc.'s animation production business was transferred to the new company.

In 2015, Emon, the Japanese branch of Haoliners Animation League, bought a 51% stake in the company, with Artland's president Kuniharu Okano owning the other 49%, in order to strengthen business and animation production relations between the two companies. In July 2017, however, it was reported that the company was closing down due to financial debt. Kuniharu Okano later stated that "the company was seeking restructuring help" rather than shutting down, but in August of the same year Emon reported having transferred its stakes to Tokyo-based company LEVELS, citing difficulties with restructuring an overseas animation studio. The debt incurred by Artland is reported to have been from outsourcing, which was said to have "comprised almost 90% of its production costs."

Works

Television series
Super Dimension Fortress Macross (1982–1983, with Studio Nue and Tatsunoko)
Super Dimension Century Orguss (1983–1984, with Studio Nue and TMS Entertainment)
Yūgo (2003, episodes 7–13)
Gag Manga Biyori (2005)
Mushishi (2005–2006)
We Were There (2006)
Gag Manga Biyori 2 (2006)
Happiness! (2006–2007)
Katekyō Hitman Reborn! (2006–2010)
Kono Aozora ni Yakusoku wo ~Yōkoso Tsugumi Ryōhe~ (2007)
Kenkō Zenrakei Suieibu Umishō (2007)
Gunslinger Girl -Il Teatrino- (2008)
Hakushaku to Yōsei (2008)
Tytania (2008–2009)
Demon King Daimao (2010)
Tantei Opera Milky Holmes 2 (2012, with J.C.Staff)
Tantei Opera Milky Holmes Alternative (2012-2013, with J.C. Staff)
Senran Kagura (2013)
Mushishi ~Next Passage~ (2014)
Komori-san Can't Decline (2015)
Seven Mortal Sins (2017, with TNK)

OVA/ONA/Specials
Star Cat Fullhouse (1989)
Blue Flames (1989)
Koiko's Daily Life (1989)
Meisō-Ō Border (1991)
Bubblegum Crash (1991, with Artmic)
Genocyber (1994, with Artmic)
Legend of the Galactic Heroes (1996–1997, episodes 88, 91, 94, 97, 103, and 109)
Gall Force: The Revolution (1996–1997)
Legend of the Galactic Heroes: A Hundred Billion Stars, A Hundred Billion Lights (1998, episodes 9–12, 16, and 21–23)
Legend of the Galactic Heroes: Spiral Labyrinth (2000, episodes 15, 18, and 24–26)
Gunslinger Girl -Il Teatrino- (2008)
Mushishi: The Shadow That Devours the Sun (2014)
Mushishi: Path of Thorns (2014)

Animated films
Megazone 23 Part I (1985, with AIC)
Megazone 23 Part II (1986, with AIC)
Legend of the Galactic Heroes: My Conquest is the Sea of Stars (1988, with Madhouse)
Mushishi: Bell Droplets (2015)

References

External links
 Official website (Animation Stuido Artland Inc.) 
 

 
Japanese animation studios
Animation studios in Tokyo
Macross
Mass media companies established in 1978
Musashino, Tokyo
Japanese companies established in 1978